The S5.142 (AKA DST-25) is a liquid pressure-fed rocket engine burning N2O4/UDMH with an O/F of 1.85. It is used for crew-rated spacecraft propulsion applications. It was used in KTDU-80 propulsion module from the Soyuz-TM to the Soyuz-TMA-M, as the low thrust thruster (DPO-M). As of the Soyuz MS, KTDU-80 does not use DPO-M anymore.

It is rated for 300,000 starts with a total firing time of 25,000 seconds and can do single burns from 0.03 seconds to 4,000 seconds. Each unit weights .

Versions
This engine has been used in crewed Russian space program since the Soyuz TM-23. There are two versions:
 S5.142 (AKA DST-25): Version used as DPO-M (attitude control thrusters) on the KTDU-80 unit of the Soyuz-TM up to the Soyuz-TMA-M.
 S5.142A: A version of the S5.142 adapted for the KVTK upper stage for the Angara rocket.

See also
KB KhIMMASH
KTDU-80
Soyuz-TMA

References

External links
 KB KhIMMASH Official Page (in Russian)

Rocket engines of Russia
Rocket engines using hypergolic propellant
Rocket engines using the pressure-fed cycle
KB KhimMash rocket engines